Vezičevo is a village situated in Petrovac na Mlavi municipality in Serbia.

Записи у Везичеву 
Храст, 150м са леве стране пута Бусур-Везичево, око 500м од границе са Бусуром.

References

Populated places in Braničevo District